Dror Sttzki is a former Israeli footballer who played in Maccabi Netanya in the 1950s and 1960s.

Honours
Israel State Cup
Runner-up (1): 1954
Second Division
Runner-up (1): 1963-64

References

Living people
Israeli Jews
Israeli footballers
Maccabi Netanya F.C. players
Liga Leumit players
Association footballers not categorized by position
Year of birth missing (living people)